The 2009 European Cup, known as the rugbyleague.com European Cup due to sponsorship, was a rugby league football tournament.

The revamped European Cup 2009 involved six teams competing in two groups of three. Participating teams were: Ireland, Scotland, Wales, Serbia, Lebanon and Italy. Russia were scheduled to take part in the competition, but were forced to pull out due to board restructuring within the Russian Rugby League Federation. They were replaced by the RLEF European Shield winners, Italy.

Squads

Lebanon
Coach:  John Elias

 Hazem El Masri was no longer available after retiring from the sport.
 Robbie Farah was unavailable due to being named in Australia's Four Nations squad.
 Charlie Farah, Anthony Farah, Nathan Dib and Jarrod Saffy were all injury withdrawals.

Wales
Coach:  Iestyn Harris (Crusaders Rugby League)

 Anthony Blackwood (Celtic Crusaders), Ben Evans (Warrington Wolves), Rhys Evans (Warrington Wolves) and Craig Kopczak (Bradford Bulls) were put on a four-man stand-by list that was used in case of injuries.
 Notable omissions included Glenn Morrison, David Mills and James Evans.

Serbia
Coach:  Gerard Stokes (Whitehaven)

Konstantin Putkin Unattached - Rugby Union

Scotland
Coach:  Steve McCormack

Ireland
Coach:  Andy Kelly

 Sean Gleeson, Gareth Haggerty and Eamon O'Carroll were not selected through injury.

Italy
Coach:  Carlo Napolitano

 Bradford's Chris Nero was forced to withdraw from the Italian squad.

Group 1

Results

Final standings

Group 2

Results

Final standings

Finals

Championship final

3rd Place Match

5th place Match

Sources
 2009 European Cup at rugbyleagueplanet.com
 Ireland VS Serbia 09 Appointment

References

European Nations Cup
European Cup
European Cup
European Cup
European Cup
European Cup
European Cup
European Cup